Pont-de-l'Arche is a commune of the Eure département in France. Notable monuments include the parish church of Notre-Dame-des-Arts, which was built in the late Flamboyant style.

Population

See also
Communes of the Eure department

References

External links

Blog about the city

Communes of Eure